Dargin may refer to:

Dargwa language, Caucasus
Dargwa people, Caucasus
Dargiń, Poland

People with the surname
Alan Dargin (1967–2008), Australian musician
Edward Vincent Dargin (1898–1981), American Roman Catholic bishop

Language and nationality disambiguation pages